Baava ( Brother-in-law) is a 2010 Telugu-language romantic comedy-drama film, produced by M. L. Padma Kumar Chowdary on Sri Keerthi Creations banner and directed by Rambabu. The film stars Siddharth, Pranitha, and Rajendra Prasad. The music is composed by Chakri. The film was a disaster at box office. It was remade in Bangladeshi Bengali as Bhalobasar Rong (2012).

Plot 
Veerababu (Siddharth) is a carefree youth who lives in a village with his parents. His father Seetharamudu (Rajendra Prasad) marries a girl (Pavitra Lokesh) from a big family against her family's wishes, and they do not accept them as part of their family. All his life, Seetharam spends time regretting that he separated his wife from her family and yearns to be part of a big family. Seetharam wants his son Veerababu to marry a girl from a big family and have a status of a son-in-law. Meanwhile, Veerababu falls in love with Varalakshmi (Pranitha), a girl from the nearby village. Later it is revealed that she is Veerababu's maternal relative, and they do not agree to their marriage. Seetharam worries that his son's fate is going to be just like him and tries to dissuade him from marrying Varalakshmi. However, he later helps his son and story. The rest of the story revolves around how Veerababu wins the hearts of his girlfriend's family members and ends with their family accepting both the couples as part of their family.

Cast

 Siddharth as Veerababu and young Seetharamudu
 Pranitha as Varalakshmi
 Rajendra Prasad as Seetharamudu, Veerababu's father
 Pavitra Lokesh as Veerababu's mother
 Brahmanandam
 Ali
 Sindhu Tolani
 Surekha Vani
 Tanikella Bharani
 Ahuti Prasad
 Raghu Babu
 Y. Kasi Viswanath
 Srinivasa Reddy
 Satyam Rajesh
 Duvvasi Mohan
 Praveen 
 Uttej 
 Narsing Yadav
 Samrat Reddy
 Bharat
 Prabhas Sreenu
 Jogi Naidu
 Rajitha
 Ushasri
 Jaya Murali

Soundtrack

Music composed by Chakri.

Release 
Serish Nanisetti of The Hindu gave a negative review and opined that "The dénouement is a dressed up feudal drama masquerading as a cycle race. Even before the beginning you can predict the contrived end". A critic from The Times of India gave the film a rating of two out of five stars and wrote that "Although, the village backdrop is captivating, but the plot of childhood friends who later re-unite as lovers, has been done-to-death by T-Town dream merchants". Radhika Rajamani of Rediff gave the film the same rating and stated that "All in all, Baava is rather pedestrian fare. It's quite disappointing to see performances by the artistes go waste in a script like this".

References

External links 
 

2010 films
2010s Telugu-language films
Telugu films remade in other languages
Films scored by Chakri